ITU Maritime Faculty is a faculty of the Istanbul Technical University in Turkey, which is dedicated to maritime science and technology.

The history of the faculty dates back to the "Merchant Navy Boarding School", which was established on December 5, 1884 at Heybeliada, Istanbul as a part of the Ottoman Naval Academy with the aim of strengthening civilian navigation and seamanship in the country. During the Republican era, it was renamed as the High Maritime School and continued its activities in the following decades. Finally, in 1992, it is reorganized as Faculty of Maritime and tied to the Istanbul Technical University.  

The school has two departments:
 Department of Maritime, Transportation and Management Engineering
 Department of Ship Machinery and Management Engineering

The campus is located in Tuzla, Istanbul.

The school possesses four vessels for training purposes:
 MV Akdeniz, a 1955 built decommissioned passenger ship, which is used as accommodation and training
 RV MTA Sismik 1, a 1942 built decommissioned research vessel
 Hopa, a tugboat
 Martı, a ship's tender.

References

External links 
 ITU School of Maritime, En
 ITU School of Maritime, Tr
 Campus images

Istanbul Technical University
Maritime colleges
Educational institutions established in 1884
Tuzla, Istanbul
1884 establishments in the Ottoman Empire